Sarithira Nayagan is a 1984 Indian Tamil-language film, directed by  D. Yoganand. The film stars Sivaji Ganesan, Sharada, Prabhu and Radha. It is a remake of the Telugu film Chanda Sasanudu. The film was released on 26 May 1984.

Plot 
The plot revolves around two siblings who are forcibly separated by the villains in pursuit of their inheritance. Years later, their offspring fall in love and collaborate to unravel the mystery surrounding the death of the male lead's father.

Cast 
Sivaji Ganesan
Sharada
Prabhu
Radha
M. N. Nambiar
Thengai Srinivasan
Jaishankar
Jayamalini
R. S. Manohar

Soundtrack 
Soundtrack was composed by M. S. Viswanathan, with lyrics by Vaali.

Reception 
Jeyamanmadhan of Kalki criticised the film's screenplay for being overstuffed and confusing.

References

External links 
 

1980s Tamil-language films
1984 films
Films directed by D. Yoganand
Films scored by M. S. Viswanathan
Tamil remakes of Telugu films